Joakim Hedqvist (born 22 November 1977) is a Swedish professional bandy player, who currently plays for Edsbyns IF in Elitserien, the top division of Swedish bandy, with whom he has won five consecutive Swedish championships.

During the season 2008/2009 he started to represent the Russian team HK Zorkij. He ended the contract before the intended time and returned to Sweden and play with Edsbyns IF.
 
He made his international début in Bandy World Championship 2009 where the Swedish team won gold medals and Hedqvist ended on top of the scoring table together with Jevgenij Ivanusjkin on 14 goals.

Clubs
2008/2009-  Edsbyns IF	 
2008/2009-2008/2009  HK Zorkij, Russia
2007/2008-2004/2005  Edsbyns IF	 
2003/2004-2002/2003   Broberg/Söderhamn Bandy 
2001/2002-2000/2001   Edsbyns IF	 
1999/2000-1993/1994   Broberg/Söderhamn Bandy

External links
Joakim Hedqvist profile at Bandysidan.nu

1977 births
Living people
Swedish bandy players
Expatriate bandy players in Russia
Swedish expatriate sportspeople in Russia
Edsbyns IF players
Zorky Krasnogorsk players
Broberg/Söderhamn Bandy players
Sweden international bandy players
Bandy World Championship-winning players